Flora Caroline Twort (24 June 1893 – 1985) was an English painter who specialised in watercolours and pastels of the scenes and people of Petersfield, Hampshire.

Twort was born in Yeovil, Somerset; her parents were Albert Samuel Twort and Jane Rapley.

Twort began painting at the age of four, and was educated at the South Hampstead High School, London School of Art, the Regent Street Polytechnic and the Slade School of Art. At the end of World War I she moved to Petersfield, where she ran a secondhand bookshop at Numbers 1 and 2 The Square, in partnership with two other young women. The shop also sold handmade jewellery, pottery and textiles and gained a reputation as one of the finest book shops in the South of England. In 1934 she joined the Society of Women Artists.

Her studio was above this shop until 1948, when the three partners decided to give up the shop and Twort moved to a studio in the nearby Church Path. Her work was exhibited in the Royal Academy and other London galleries, and she continued to paint until she was 81.

Her pictures, usually watercolours, typically contain local scenes of Petersfield which are filled with people and animals, with such subjects as The Square on Market Day, or the fair on Petersfield Heath. She also produced drawings in pencil, crayon, charcoal and pastel, including some fine portraits.

Twort was a friend of Nevil Shute, who in 1925 proposed marriage to her, unsuccessfully, though they remained lifelong friends and she became godmother to his daughter Shirley Anne. For a short period in 1939, Shute and his family lived at The Old Mill at Langstone, which she owned.

On her death she bequeathed her studio cottage and pictures to Hampshire County Council. A selection of her pictures is now displayed in her old studios, which have become the 
Flora Twort Gallery; the selection is changed twice per year. Hampshire County Council has also put 600 of her pictures online.

References

, Hantsweb biography

Further reading
Flora Twort: A Petersfield Artist, Alice Munro-Faure, Hampshire Papers, 1995 (Hampshire County Council Record Series monograph)

External links
The Flora Twort Gallery
Flora Twort,  images of Petersfield Taro Fair, Hantsweb
Search the Flora Twort Collection, HantsWeb

1893 births
1985 deaths
20th-century English painters
20th-century English women artists
Alumni of the University of Westminster
Animal artists
English landscape artists
English portrait painters
English watercolourists
English women painters
People educated at South Hampstead High School
People from Petersfield
People from Yeovil
Women watercolorists